Maghroumeh (also romanized as Maghroumah) is Najwa Karam's eighth studio album.

Track listing
 "Maghroumeh" (I'm in love)
 "Wada'ato" (I said goodbye to him)
 "Ghamzeh" (A wink)
 "Noqta al-Satr" (Point on the line)
 "Mahsoub Alayi" (I have to)
 "A'am Beqoulo" (They are saying)
 "Telt Malek" (A beautiful appearance)
 "El-Toba" (I'll never do it again)

1998 albums
Najwa Karam albums
Rotana Records albums